Janek Ambros (born April 19, 1988) is an American film director, producer and screenwriter based in Los Angeles, California. He is also the founder of Assembly Line Entertainment, an American film production company. Ambros is widely known for directing award winning documentary films like Imminent Threat, Mondo Hollywoodland and Ukrainians in Exile.

Biography

Early life and education
Ambros was born in 1988, in Morristown, New Jersey. He attended The Albany Academy where he completed his early education in 2006. He received his bachelor's degree in Economics from Siena College in 2010. Later, he attended New York Film Academy where he earned his Master of Fine Arts degree in 2012.

Career
After graduating from Siena College, Ambros founded his film production company, Assembly Line Entertainment in 2011, in Los Angeles, California. He co-produced Asa Butterfield and Ethan Hawke starrer drama film Ten Thousand Saints in 2015. The film had its world premiere at the Sundance Film Festival on January 23, 2015.

In September 2015, Ambros collaborated with James Cromwell for his directorial debut, Imminent Threat. He also wrote and produced the film. Imminent Threat is a documentary film about the War on Terror's impact on civil liberties in the United States.

In 2017, Ambros produced and directed a French short film, Le Quinze Mai à Paris (May 15th in Paris). The film received positive response and was nominated for awards at several film festivals around the world. Later that year, he produced Valley of Bones featuring Autumn Reeser and Rhys Coiro.

In 2019, Ambros collaborated with James Cromwell for the second time and directed Mondo Hollywoodland, a comedy/sci fi film. The film was released theatrically and on VOD in 2021. The film won the Jury Prize for Creative Vision at the Downtown Los Angeles Film Festival. Later in 2019, Ambros co-produced Human Capital, an American-Italian drama film directed by Marc Meyers and starring Liev Schreiber. In 2022, Ambros executive produced Monica. The film was premiered at the 79th Venice International Film Festival and was nominated for the Golden Lion.

In October 2022, Ambros directed Ukrainians in Exile, a war documentary film shot in the Polish city of Przemysl. The film was executive produced by two time Academy Award winner Janusz Kaminski. The film premiered at the Morelia International Film Festival on 23 October 2022. Ukrainians in Exile was awarded with the Best Documentary Award at the 76th Salerno Film Festival in December 2022.

Ambros collaborated with his frequent creative partner James Cromwell for Nixon's Nixon, an adaptation of Russell Lees' play. The film is scheduled to be released in 2023.

Filmography

Source

References

External links
Official website

1988 births
Living people
American male screenwriters
People from Morristown, New Jersey
Film directors from New Jersey
Screenwriters from New Jersey